Soho Estates is a British property company created by entrepreneur and pornographer Paul Raymond. The holdings of Soho Estates are mainly based in Soho, a district in the West End of London.

Projects include the proposed autumn 2016 demolition of the Foyles Building at 111-119 Charing Cross Road, to be replaced by a new building, Ilona Rose House.

References

External links 

1949 establishments in England
British companies established in 1949
Property companies based in London
Real estate investment trusts of the United Kingdom
Soho, London